Henry J. "Fuzzy" McGlew of Chelsea, Massachusetts was a quarterback and head coach of the Notre Dame college football program.

In his two years as a starting quarterback from 1901 to 1902, the team achieved a combined record of 14–3–2.  His best game came against the American College of Medicine and Surgery in 1902, when he made runs of 80, 65 and 40 yards and scored one touchdown.  In 1903, he moved to left end, and helped the team to achieve their first undefeated season.  McGlew never once fumbled the ball during his playing career.

McGlew was a teammate of College Football Hall of Famer Red Salmon, and succeeded him as head coach of the Irish in 1905.  His lone season as coach included a record-setting 142–0 victory over American Medical, but the team finished a disappointing 5–4, and McGlew retired from the coaching ranks.

Head coaching record

References
Steele, Michael R. The Fighting Irish Football Encyclopedia. Champaign, IL: Sports Publishing LLC (1996).  p. 25-26, 406

1879 births
Year of death missing
American football ends
American football quarterbacks
Notre Dame Fighting Irish football coaches
Notre Dame Fighting Irish football players
Sportspeople from Chelsea, Massachusetts
Irish emigrants to the United States (before 1923)